Lancaster is a city in and the county seat of Lancaster County, Pennsylvania, and one of the oldest inland cities in the United States. With a population at the 2020 census of 58,039, it ranks 11th in population among Pennsylvania's municipalities. The Lancaster metropolitan area population is 552,984, making it the 104th-largest metropolitan area in the U.S. and second-largest in the South Central Pennsylvania area.

The city's primary industries include healthcare, tourism, public administration, manufacturing, and both professional and semi-professional services. Lancaster is a hub of Pennsylvania's Dutch Country.

History

18th century

Originally called Hickory Town, the city was renamed after the English city of Lancaster by native John Wright. Its symbol, the red rose, is from the House of Lancaster. Lancaster was part of the 1681 Penn's Woods Charter of William Penn, and was laid out by James Hamilton in 1734. It was incorporated as a borough in 1742 and incorporated as a city in 1818.

During the American Revolution, Lancaster served for one day as the temporary capital of the United States, seated at the Court House (built 1739, destroyed by fire in 1784 and rebuilt before relocating to current Lancaster County Courthouse in 1852; original site is now the Soldiers & Sailors Monument at Penn Square c. 1874), on September 27, 1777, after the Continental Congress fled Philadelphia, which had been captured by the British. The revolutionary government then moved still farther away to York, Pennsylvania.

19th century

Lancaster was the capital of Pennsylvania from 1799 to 1812, with the state capital located at the Court House (built 1784 and demolished 1852 and now site of Soldiers & Sailors Monument at Penn Square). In 1812, the capital was moved to Harrisburg, where it has remained since.

U.S. census reports show that, from 1800 to 1900, Lancaster ranked among the nation's top 100 most populous urban areas.

In 1851, the current Lancaster County Prison, known locally as Lancaster Castle, was built in the city but shares no visual similarities with the Lancaster Castle in England. The prison remains in use, and was used for public hangings until 1912.  It replaced a 1737 structure on a different site.

The first long-distance paved road in the United States was the former Philadelphia and Lancaster Turnpike, which connected the cities of Lancaster and Philadelphia. Opened in 1795, the turnpike was paved with stone the whole way, and overlaid with gravel. The sixty-two-mile turnpike cost more than $450,000, a staggering sum for the time. The route followed what is now Pennsylvania Route 340 (also called the "Old Philadelphia Pike") from Lancaster to Thorndale and U.S. Route 30 Business and U.S. Route 30 from Thorndale to Philadelphia.

The city of Lancaster was home to several important figures in American history.  Wheatland, the estate of James Buchanan, the fifteenth President of the United States, is one of Lancaster's most popular attractions. Thaddeus Stevens, considered among the most powerful members of the United States House of Representatives, lived in Lancaster as an attorney. Stevens gained notoriety as a Radical Republican and for his abolitionism. The Fulton Opera House in the city was named for Lancaster native Robert Fulton, a renaissance man who created the first fully functional steamboat. All of these individuals have had local schools named after them.

After the American Revolutionary War, Lancaster became an iron-foundry center. Two of the most common products needed by pioneers to settle the Frontier were manufactured in Lancaster:  the Conestoga wagon and the Pennsylvania long rifle. The Conestoga wagon was named after the Conestoga River, which runs through the city.  The innovative gunsmith William Henry lived in Lancaster and was a U.S. Congressman and leader during and after the American Revolution.

In 1803, Meriwether Lewis visited Lancaster to be educated in survey methods by the well-known surveyor Andrew Ellicott. During his visit, Lewis learned to plot latitude and longitude as part of his overall training needed to lead the Lewis and Clark Expedition.

In 1879, Franklin Winfield Woolworth opened his first successful five and dime store in the city of Lancaster, the F. W. Woolworth Company.

20th and 21st centuries
Lancaster was one of the winning communities for the All-America City award in 2000.

In 2009, a community organization installed and began monitoring 164 closed-circuit cameras in Lancaster, which engendered some local opposition.

On October 13, 2011, Lancaster's City Council officially recognized September 27 as Capital Day, a holiday recognizing Lancaster's one day as capital of the United States in 1777.

Geography
Lancaster is located in the Piedmont region of Pennsylvania.

Neighborhoods

 Cabbage Hill/The Hill (named for the cabbage patches kept by ethnic Germans in this area)
 Chestnut Hill
 Downtown/Center City
 Downtown Investment District
 Historic East Side
 Eighth Ward
 Gallery Row/Arts District
 Galebach Ward
 Northwest Corridor
 Penn Square
 Prospect Heights
 Seventh Ward
 Sixth Ward
 Uptown
 West End
 Woodward Hill

Climate
Under the Köppen climate classification, Lancaster falls within either a hot-summer humid continental climate (Dfa) if the  isotherm is used or a humid subtropical climate (Cfa) if the  isotherm is used. On average, the city receives 42 inches of precipitation a year. September is the wettest month of the year and February the driest. The snowiest winter on record for Lancaster was the winter of 2009-10 when 72 inches of snow fell and the smallest amount of snow on record was when four inches fell during the winter of 1949–50.

On average, the city receives 203 days of sun a year. The shortest days of the year are between December 18 and December 25, when day length is nine hours and 19 minutes. The sun reaches its lowest point in the sky of 26° between December 11 and December 31. The longest days of the year are June 19 to June 23, reaching 15 hours and one minute. The sun reaches its highest point in the sky of 73° from June 10 to July 2.

Demographics

According to the 2020 United States census, Lancaster had a population of 58,039. Of which, 40.3% were Hispanic/Latino, 38.9% were non-hispanic White, 12.6% were non-hispanic Black, 3.8% were Asian, 4.4% mixed or other.

As of the 2010 census, the city was 55.2% White, 16.3% Black or African American, 0.7% Native American, 3.0% Asian, 0.1% Native Hawaiian, and 5.8% were two or more races. 39.3% of the population were of Hispanic or Latino ancestry.

As of the census of 2000, there were 56,348 people, 20,933 households, and 12,162 families residing in the city. The population density was 7,616.5 people per square mile (2,940.0/km2). There were 23,024 housing units at an average density of 3,112.1 per square mile (1,201.3/km2). The racial makeup of the city was 61.55% White, 14.09% African American, 0.44% Native American, 2.46% Asian, 0.08% Pacific Islander, 17.44% from other races, and 3.94% from two or more races. 30.76% of the population were Hispanic or Latino people of any race.

Ethnic groups
The largest ethnic groups in Lancaster as of recent estimates are:
Puerto Rican 29.2%
German 21.2%
African American 12.8%
Irish 8.6%
English 8.2%
Italian 4.1%
Dominican 3.2%
Polish 2.0%
Scottish 1.9%
Mexican 1.8%
Cuban 1.7%
West Indian 1.0%

In 2010, 29.2% of Lancaster residents were of Puerto Rican ancestry. The city has the second highest concentration of Puerto Ricans in Pennsylvania after Reading. For this reason, it is sometimes referred to as the "Spanish Rose." Lancaster celebrates its Puerto Rican heritage once every year with the Puerto Rican Festival.

There were 20,933 households, out of which 31.6% had children under the age of 18 living with them, 33.4% were married couples living together, 19.0% had a female householder with no husband present, and 41.9% were non-families. 33.1% of all households were made up of individuals, and 9.9% had someone living alone who was 65 years of age or older. The average household size was 2.52 and the average family size was 3.23.

In the city, the population was spread out, with 27.5% under the age of 18, 13.9% from 18 to 24, 30.5% from 25 to 44, 17.7% from 45 to 64, and 10.5% who were 65 years of age or older. The median age was 30 years. For every 100 females, there were 95.2 males. For every 100 females age 18 and over, there were 91.4 males.

The median income for a household in the city was $29,770, and the median income for a family was $34,623. Males had a median income of $27,833 versus $21,862 for females. The per capita income for the city was $13,955. 21.2% of the population and 17.9% of families were below the poverty line. 29.2% of those under the age of 18 and 12.9% of those 65 and older were living below the poverty line. Poverty in Lancaster is twice the state's average, and public school records list more than 900 children as homeless. Although there are many Amish people from this area, not everyone from Lancaster is Amish, contrary to popular belief.

Economy

Since 2005, Lancaster's downtown has increased the number of specialty shops, boutiques, bars, clubs, and galleries.

Burle Business Park, the city's only commercial and industrial park. originally opened in 1942 as a U.S. Navy electronics research, development and manufacturing plant operated by RCA.  The facility was purchased after World War II by RCA. Burle Business Park was originally occupied by Burle Industries, the successor company to RCA, and a manufacturer of vacuum tube products. Burle completed a voluntary clean-up under the Pennsylvania Land Recycling Program.

Shopping
In addition to Lancaster's boutiques, vintage shops, and art galleries (Gallery Row), Park City Center is the largest enclosed shopping center in South Central Pennsylvania.  The mall includes more than 150 stores and is anchored by Boscov's, JCPenney, and Kohl's. Park City opened in September 1971.

Built in 1889, the Lancaster Central Market is the oldest continuously operated farmers market in the United States, and many tourists come to purchase the handmade Amish goods that are not commonly found elsewhere. Central Market is listed with the National Register of Historic Places, and its towers are of the Romanesque Revival style. The market underwent renovations beginning in July 2010.

Lancaster also has two outlet shopping centers, both of which are located in East Lampeter Township on U.S. Route 30. Tanger Outlets is home to about 65 stores. The Shops at Rockvale contains over 100 stores and restaurants.

Top employers
According to Lancaster's 2021 Comprehensive Annual Financial Report, the top employers in the city are:

Arts and culture

Historical landmarks

Many of Lancaster's landmarks are significant in local, state, and national history.

 Central Market – built in 1889, it is the oldest continuously run farmers' market in the United States.
 Bethel African Methodist Episcopal Church – built in 1879, the church's congregation aided freedmen migrating to the North for opportunities after the American Civil War. Their congregation had earlier aided fugitive slaves fleeing the South before the war, using their former church as a station on the Underground Railroad.
 Cork Factory Hotel – built in 1865 as Conestoga Cork Works. Later the buildings making up what is known today as Urban Place were home to Armstrong Cork Factory and Kerr Glass Company. Rezoned in 2005, Urban Place has been adapted as 49 loft-style apartments, 115,000 square feet of retail and commercial space, the Cork Factory Hotel, and Cap & Cork Restaurant.
 Fulton Opera House – the oldest continually running theater in the United States, it is one of three theaters designated as National Historic Landmarks (the others are the Walnut Street Theatre in Philadelphia and the Goldenrod Showboat in St. Louis, Missouri).
 Hamilton Watch Complex – former factory and headquarters of the Hamilton Watch Company, which in 1957 sold the world's first battery-powered watch, the Hamilton Electric 500.
 J. P. McCaskey High School – built in 1938 during the Great Depression, it is designed in the Art Deco architectural style.
Historic St. Mary's Church – built in 1854, this church has served the German-speaking Catholics of Lancaster since 1741.
 Lancaster Arts Hotel – Built in 1881, this building was the Falk and Rosenbaum Tobacco Warehouse. In October 2006, the warehouse reopened after adaptation, as Lancaster's first boutique hotel for the arts. It has 63 guest rooms (including 12 suites); an organic restaurant, John J Jeffries; and an on-site art gallery. It is registered with the Historic Hotels of America.
 Lancaster County Prison – built in 1849, it was styled after the Lancaster Castle in England.
 Rock Ford Plantation – built in 1794, this was the home of General Edward Hand, adjutant general to George Washington during the American Revolutionary War.
Unitarian Universalist Church of Lancaster, Pennsylvania - built in 1908–1909 in what is now the Historic District of Lancaster, it is unique among the buildings by C. Emlen Urban and contains stained glass by Franz Xaver Zettler (designed by Swiss-American architect Woldemar H. Ritter) and by Charles Connick.
 W. W. Griest Building – listed on the U.S. National Register of Historic Places since June 25, 1999.  It was built in 1925 in the Beaux-Arts style using granite, limestone, terra cotta, synthetics, and asphalt.  The building is named after William Walton Griest, a former Pennsylvania representative. It is the second-tallest building in the city.
 Wheatland – the historic estate of James Buchanan, the 15th President of the United States.

Art and museums

The city of Lancaster has art, craft and historical museums. The Demuth Museum is located in the former home of the well-known painter Charles Demuth, who had a national reputation in the 20th century. Additional museums include the Lancaster Museum of Art and the Philips Museum of Art on the campus of Franklin & Marshall College.  Art students at the state-of-the-art Pennsylvania College of Art and Design present their works at the academy's gallery, which is open to the public. LancasterARTS, a non-profit organization founded in 2002, promotes contemporary arts and crafts.

Lancaster city has a thriving art community. Gallery Row on the 100 block of North Prince St. features a block of art galleries, and the city proper has over 40 galleries and artists' studios.  The galleries host a "First Friday" each month, extending their business hours to exhibit new artwork and new artists to the public.

The Lancaster County Quilts and Textile Museum, completed in 2007, celebrates the art of the hand-sewn quilts and other textile items produced by women of the region's Amish and Mennonite communities. The museum was closed in 2011. The Lancaster Mennonite Historical Society Museum and the Heritage Center Museum display artifacts and interpret the region's unique history.  Children can have a hands-on experience with educational learning at the Hands-on House, also known as the Children's Museum of Lancaster.  Nature and geology-minded visitors can view the exhibits of the Louise Arnold Tanger Arboretum and the North Museum of Nature and Science.

The National Watch & Clock Museum, founded in 1977, has the largest collection of clocks and watches in North America.

Stevens and Smith Historic Site is located within the Vine Street lobby of the Lancaster County Convention Center. The site includes the preserved home of U.S. Senator Thaddeus Stevens and his companion Lydia Hamilton Smith. The underground portion of the site includes a recently discovered Underground Railroad feature: a converted water cistern used in the antebellum years to hide fugitive slaves on their way to freedom.

In Lancaster County, the Landis Valley Museum in Manheim Township has exhibits that interpret the county's history and culture, especially as a center of ethnic German Amish and Mennonite culture.

Music and entertainment 
The Lancaster Symphony Orchestra has been performing since 1947. The Fulton Opera House is one of the oldest working theaters in the United States. The Ware Center hosts live theater, concerts, and performances.

Sports

Baseball

The Barnstormers played their inaugural season in 2005, filling Lancaster's 44-year period without professional baseball since the demise of the Red Roses. Their main Atlantic League rival is the Revolution from nearby York.

Lancaster is the hometown of Major League Baseball alumnus Tom Herr. He played for the St. Louis Cardinals for a majority of his career. He also played for the Minnesota Twins, Philadelphia Phillies, New York Mets, and the San Francisco Giants. Herr subsequently coached the Hempfield High School Black Knights baseball team for several years.  He also managed the Lancaster Barnstormers in their first season. The Barnstormers have won the Atlantic League Championship 3 times. In 2006, 2014, and in 2022.

Cycling

The Lancaster Bicycle Club hosts an annual Covered Bridge Metric Century bicycle race. In 2010, more than 2,500 riders participated.

The city of Lancaster hosted the Tom Bamford Lancaster Classic, an international, professional bicycle racing event held each June since 1992. It was part of the 2006–2007 UCI America Tour and the 2007 USA Cycling Professional Tour.

Golf

Professional golf is well represented by the Professional Golf Association's Jim Furyk.  He placed 4th in the  1998 and 2003 Masters tournament, won the 2003 U.S. Open, placed 4th in the 1997, 1998, and 2006 British Open, and placed 6th in the 1997 PGA championship.  Furyk also won the Vardon Trophy in 2006.  He is an alumnus of Manheim Township High School, located in the immediate suburb of Manheim Township.

The 2015 U.S. Women's Open was held at the Lancaster Country Club.

Soccer

Lancaster has both a men's and a women's semi-professional soccer club. Pennsylvania Classics AC play in the National Premier Soccer League, a fourth-tier in the American soccer pyramid. Lancaster Inferno FC play in United Women's Soccer, a second-tier league. Both clubs play their home games at Crusader Stadium on the campus of Lancaster Catholic High School. The city also has an amateur team called Lancaster City FC that plays other regional clubs in the United Soccer League of Pennsylvania.

Field hockey
In 2013, USA Field Hockey announced their intentions to move their national training center for the United States women's national field hockey team to Lancaster County. They signed with Spooky Nook Sports through 2022 after searching for many years for a northeastern site.

Amateur sports in Lancaster

Lancaster's suburban area hosts several amateur sports teams. Ice hockey is represented by the Central Penn Panthers, a member of the junior-level Atlantic Metropolitan Hockey League, and both the Lancaster Firebirds, and Regency Panthers youth amateur ice hockey organization of the USA Hockey's Atlantic District.  American football is represented by the Lancaster Lightning, a member of the semi-professional North American Football League, that plays in nearby Kinzers. A close cousin of American football, rugby, is represented by the Roses Rugby Football Club of the Mid Atlantic Rugby Football Union, of which the Roses RFC were the 2005 champions. Roller derby is represented by the Dutchland Derby Rollers, an all-female roller derby team which plays to raise money for various charities, and is currently ranked #23 in the world by Derby News Network.

Historical Lancaster teams

The Lancaster Red Roses of the Eastern Professional Baseball League are the most well-known of Lancaster's defunct teams. They played from 1906 to 1909, and from 1940 to their last season in 1961. The Red Roses were called the "Lancaster Maroons" from 1896 to 1899 and the "Lancaster Red Sox" in 1932.

The "Lancaster Red Roses" was also the name of a basketball franchise in the Continental Basketball Association (at that time, the Eastern Professional Basketball League) from 1946 to 1949, and from 1953 to 1955. The CBA later hosted another Lancaster team called the Lightning from 1981 to 1985. The Lightning later moved to Rockford, Illinois, where they played until the 2007 season. The Storm of the Eastern Basketball Alliance played from 1997 to 2000, winning the league championship in 1999. The last professional basketball team to call Lancaster home was the Liberty, who played as a member of the now-defunct Global Professional Basketball League in 2009.

Government

Local
Lancaster operates under a mayor / council form of government. Danene Sorace is the 43rd mayor of Lancaster city. The City Council is composed of seven members: President Ismail Smith Wade-El, Jaime Arroyo, Amanda Bakay, Faith Craig, Janet Diaz, Xavier Garcia-Molina, Pete Soto. On November 7, 2017, Councilwoman Danene Sorace was elected Lancaster's 43rd mayor.

The city has a full range of services including public safety, health, housing, parks, streets & highways, Water operations and sewer operations.

Federal
While Lancaster County as a whole tilts heavily Republican, the city of Lancaster leans much more Democratic. Registered Democrats held a 13,000 voter registration advantage over registered Republicans in the city as of June 2009. U.S. presidential candidate Barack Obama easily won the city of Lancaster, receiving 76% of the vote during the 2008 presidential election.

Federally, Lancaster is part of Pennsylvania's 11th congressional district, represented by Republican Lloyd Smucker of nearby West Lampeter Township.

The state's senior member of the United States Senate is Democrat Bob Casey, first elected in 2006. The state's junior member of the United States Senate is Democrat John Fetterman, first elected in 2022. The Governor of Pennsylvania is Democrat Josh Shapiro, first elected in 2022.  Additionally, the city of Lancaster is the headquarters of the Constitution Party.

Lancaster was home to Democrat James Buchanan, the fifteenth president of the United States. Buchanan arrived in Lancaster in 1809 to practice law. He took up residence near the courthouse on N. Duke Street. In 1848 he purchased Wheatland, a Federal style mansion in the suburbs. He was elected president in 1856.

Education
Education in Lancaster is provided by many private and public institutions. The School District of Lancaster runs the city's public schools. Established in 1836, it is the second oldest school district in Pennsylvania.

The local high school campuses are McCaskey and McCaskey East.  Lancaster Catholic High School has a long history in the county; it was founded in 1926. It currently falls under the jurisdiction of the diocese of Harrisburg. With a P-12 enrollment of more than 500 students, Lancaster Country Day School is one of the region's largest independent nonsectarian schools.  Founded in 1908 as the Shippen School for Girls, the school became coeducational and relocated from downtown Lancaster to its Hamilton Road address in 1949. La Academia Partnership Charter School, opened in 1998, serves grades 6–12. It is the only public charter school in Lancaster County, and is open to any student residing in the county. Manheim Township School District is a four-year public high school located in Lancaster. It is the only high school in the Manheim Township School District. It is supported by a 7th and 8th grade middle school, a 5th and 6th grade intermediate school, and five elementary schools.

The Lancaster area hosts several colleges and universities, including Consolidated School of Business, Franklin & Marshall College, Lancaster General College of Nursing & Health Sciences, Lancaster Theological Seminary, Lancaster Bible College, Pennsylvania College of Art and Design, Thaddeus Stevens College of Technology, Millersville University of Pennsylvania, Central Pennsylvania College, Elizabethtown College and the Harrisburg Area Community College.

Media

Print
 LNP, the county's predominant newspaper
 La Voz Hispana, the city's Spanish-language edition
 Sunday News, the county's weekly edition
 Fly Magazine, Lancaster City's Downtown Guide
 Fine Living Lancaster, a regional lifestyle magazine

Television

Lancaster is part of the Harrisburg-Lancaster-York market. In addition to WGAL and TeleCentro TV, the city is served by CBS/MyNetworkTV/CW affiliate WHP-TV 21, ABC affiliate WHTM-TV 27, PBS member station WITF-TV 33, and Fox affiliate WPMT 43. WPMT is based in York, while the other major stations are based in Harrisburg.

Infrastructure

Fire department

The Lancaster City Bureau of Fire operates three engine companies and one truck company. It was established on April 1, 1882, and has a total of 74 uniformed personnel. The Bureau responds to more than 3,000 emergency calls annually.

Police department
The city of Lancaster is protected by the City of Lancaster Bureau of Police. Founded in 1865, the Bureau of Police is located at 39 W. Chestnut Street in downtown Lancaster, and consists of approximately 147 sworn officers and 46 civilian employees. The Bureau of Police operates out of twelve sectors, or districts, and operates in four divisions, including Patrol, Criminal Investigative, Administrative Services, and Contracted Services. The Bureau also remains the largest law enforcement agency in Lancaster County.

Transportation

The Red Rose Transit Authority (RRTA) provides local public bus transit to the city of Lancaster and surrounding areas in Lancaster County. RRTA is headquartered outside the city of Lancaster. The Queen Street Station in downtown Lancaster serves as a transit hub for several RRTA bus routes.

Bieber Transportation Group (formerly Capitol Trailways) formerly provided intercity bus transit from the Lancaster Train and Bus Station to Reading, Norristown, Philadelphia, and New York City to the east, and York to the west; service was discontinued on April 1, 2018. Intercity bus service from York and Lancaster to New York City was restored by OurBus in July 2018.

Amtrak also serves the Lancaster Train and Bus Station, located on the northernmost edge of the city at 53 East McGovern Avenue. The Pennsylvanian, with service between Pittsburgh and New York City via Philadelphia, as well as the Keystone Service, which runs from Harrisburg to New York City via Philadelphia, both serve Lancaster. The city is served by the Lancaster Airport, located six miles (10 km) north of downtown and just south of Lititz, with commercial air service by Southern Airways Express to Washington DC via Dulles, Pittsburgh, and Nantucket on Saturdays.

Lancaster is also a hub for automobile traffic, with many major roadways passing through or around the city, including US 30, US 222, PA 283, PA 72, and PA 272.

Utilities
Electricity in Lancaster is provided by PPL Corporation in Allentown. UGI Utilities supplies natural gas to the city. The City of Lancaster Water Department provides water service to residents and businesses in the city. The city's Public Works department provides wastewater service to Lancaster, operating the City of Lancaster Advanced Wastewater Treatment Plant which serves the city and surrounding municipalities. Trash and recycling collection is provided by the city's Public Works department.

Notable people

Israel Aaron, rabbi and published scholar, (1859 – 1912)

Chas Alecxih, (b 1989), former American professional football player, Carolina Panthers
Benjamin Smith Barton (1766–1815), American botanist, naturalist, and physician. He was one of the first professors of natural history in the United States
James Buchanan, (1791–1868) American lawyer, diplomat and politician who served as the 15th president of the United States
Kermit S. Champa (1939–2004), art historian
Chloe Cherry, (b 1997), previously known as Chloe Couture, American actress, former pornographic actress, and model 
Adam Cole, (b 1989), professional wrestler currently signed to All Elite Wrestling (AEW)
Michael Deibert, (b 1973), author and journalist
Charles Demuth (1883-1935), watercolorist and Precisionism painter
FFH, Contemporary Christian band
Jonathan Groff, (b 1985), actor and singer 
Travis Jankowski, (b 1991), American professional baseball outfielder for the New York Mets of Major League Baseball (MLB) 
Taylor Kinney, (b 1981), American actor and model
Maria Louise Kirk (1860–1938), usually credited as Maria L. Kirk, American painter and illustrator of more than fifty books, most of them for children
Thomas Mifflin (1744–1800), American merchant, soldier, and politician from Philadelphia, Pennsylvania 
August Burns Red, metalcore band from Lancaster, Pennsylvania, formed in 2003
Anna Diller Starbuck, (1868–1929), composer, music educator, organist, and pianist. She was one of the first two women to attend Harvard University
Thaddeus Stevens, (1792–1868), member of the United States House of Representatives from Pennsylvania
Bruce Sutter, (1953-2022), professional baseball Pitcher for the Chicago Cubs, St. Louis Cardinals, and the Atlanta Braves 
Charlotte White (1782–1863), first unmarried American woman missionary sent to a foreign country

Inventions and firsts

 The Conestoga wagon was first built in Lancaster, used extensively for migrations before the development of the railroad.
 The first Pennsylvania Rifle was created by Martin Meylin in the 1700s.
 Peeps, an Easter confection shaped as marshmallow chicks covered with yellow sugar, were invented by the Rodda Candy Company of Lancaster in the 1920s. In 1953, Rodda was purchased by Sam Born, the Russian immigrant who invented ice cream "jimmies", and production was moved to Bethlehem, Pennsylvania.
 The first battery-powered watch, the Hamilton Electric 500, was released in 1957 by the Hamilton Watch Company.
 The first fountain soda water dispenser was invented in 1819 by Samuel Fahnestock.

References

Further reading
 
 Interview with the author: 
 Lottie M. Bausman, A Bibliography of Lancaster County, Pennsylvania, 1745–1912. Philadelphia: Pennsylvania Federation of Historical Societies, 1917.
 Frank Ried Diffenderffer, The Early Settlement and Population of Lancaster County and City. Lancaster, PA: The New Era, 1905.
 H. M. J. Klein, Lancaster's Golden Century, 1821–1921: A Chronicle of Men and Women Who Planned and Toiled to Build a City Strong and Beautiful. Lancaster, PA: Hager and Brother, 1921.
 The Lancaster Farmer: A Monthly Newspaper. Vol. 1 (1869) | Vol. 2 (1870) | Vol. 3 (1871) | Vol. 4 (1872) | Vol. 5 (1873) | Vol. 6 (1874) | Vol. 7 (1875) | Vol. 8 (1876) | Vol. 9 (1877) | Vol. 10 (1878) | Vol. 11 (1879) | Vol. 12 (1880) | Vol. 13 (1881) | Vol. 14 (1882) | Vol. 15 (1883) | Vol. 16 (1885) 
 Dave Pidgeon, "Battle Over City Project Moves to Courtroom", Intelligencer Journal (Lancaster, PA), July 13, 2006.
 William Riddle, One Hundred And Fifty Years of School History in Lancaster, Pennsylvania. Lancaster, PA: William Riddle, 1905.
 Israel Daniel Rupp, History of Lancaster and York Counties. n.c.: n.p., 1845.

External links

 
 Official Lancaster city events website

 
1734 establishments in the Thirteen Colonies
Cities in Lancaster County, Pennsylvania
Cities in Pennsylvania
County seats in Pennsylvania
Former capitals of the United States
Pennsylvania
Populated places established in 1734
Populated places on the Underground Railroad